Huallasaurus (meaning "duck lizard") is an extinct genus of saurolophine hadrosaur from the Late Cretaceous Los Alamitos Formation of Patagonia in Argentina. The type and only species is H. australis. Originally named as a species of Kritosaurus in 1984, it was long considered a synonym of Secernosaurus before being recognized as its own distinct genus in a 2022 study, different from other members of Kritosaurini.

Etymology 
The generic name, "Huallasaurus," combines "hualla," the Mapudungun word for "duck," and the Greek "sauros," meaning "lizard." The specific name, "australis," is derived from the Latin "australis," meaning "southern," after the discovery of the holotype specimen in southern Argentina.

Phylogeny

Depicted below is a reproduction of the phylogenetic tree produced by Rozadilla et al. (2022), including Huallasaurus and Kelumapusaura, which was described in the same study.

Paleoecology 
Huallasaurus is known from the Late Cretaceous Los Alamitos Formation of Río Negro Province, Argentina. Aeolosaurus rionegrinus, a titanosaurian sauropod, has also been named from this formation.

References

Saurolophines
Maastrichtian life
Late Cretaceous dinosaurs of South America
Cretaceous Argentina
Fossils of Argentina
Los Alamitos Formation
Golfo San Jorge Basin
Fossil taxa described in 2022